Albert Kerr is a British slalom canoeist who competed in the 1970s and 1980s.

He won a gold medal in the K-1 event at the 1977 ICF Canoe Slalom World Championships in Spittal. He also won two world championship golds in the K-1 team event in 1979 and 1981.

References
ICF medallists for Olympic and World Championships - Part 2: rest of flat water (now sprint) and remaining canoeing disciplines: 1936-2007.

British male canoeists
Living people
Year of birth missing (living people)
Medalists at the ICF Canoe Slalom World Championships